Human Killing Machine (also known as HKM) is a 2D fighting video game. The game was developed by British company Tiertex, who hired external team Blue Turtle (Nick Pavis and Leigh Christian) to produce the graphics, and published by U.S. Gold, released in March 1989. It was touted as a sequel to Tiertex's home computer conversion of Street Fighter (as the two companies later did with Strider II). It was released for 8-bit and 16-bit home computer formats.

Gameplay
The player must defeat computer controlled characters from around the world in round-based one-on-one combat. The game is based on the engine from each system's Street Fighter port, with the time limit removed, and an energy recovery system.

Characters
The following characters are featured in the game:

Reception

At the time of release, the ZX Spectrum version of the game was generally well received, scoring 9/10 for graphics in Your Sinclair, who added "Possibly because of the memory used for the excellent background graphics and big - nay, hooge - sprites, the range of moves available in battle seemed relatively limited. It was, however, still fairly easy to beat opponents". The game scored 78% overall in Sinclair User, who summed it up with "backgrounds are static, but detailed... main graphics are nicely animated with slick arm and leg movements - maybe the best I've seen in this sort of game. The graphics may even be slightly better [than Street Fighter]". The 73% review in Crash stated "The scenery's really beautiful and the large characters are well drawn and animated", and thought it was "lacking in originality, but still very addictive".

Other versions did not fare as well. Zzap!64 said of the Commodore versions "repetitive with little skill involved", and gave the game 31%. Maff Evans, a secondary reviewer in the magazine said it was "an incredibly weak program and one of the worst fighting games I've ever seen". Amstrad Action listed HKM and Street Fighter as "some of the most dreadful arcade conversions on the CPC".

The Spanish magazine Microhobby valued the game with the following scores: Originality: 40% Graphics: 90% Motion: 80% Sound: 50% Difficulty: 70% Addiction: 80%

Retrospective reviews of the game were more negative. YouTuber Stuart Ashen featured the Atari ST version of the game on his web series, Terrible Old Games You’ve Probably Never Heard Of, criticizing the shoddy mechanics, jerky control scheme and frame rate, unfair difficulty, poor graphics, lack of sound effects and animation frames, stereotypical characters, and overall lack of improvement from Tiertex’s conversion of Street Fighter.

References

1989 video games
Amiga games
Amstrad CPC games
Atari ST games
Commodore 64 games
Fighting games
Video game sequels
Street Fighter games
ZX Spectrum games
Tiertex Design Studios games
U.S. Gold games
Video games set in the Soviet Union
Video games set in Spain
Video games set in the Netherlands
Video games set in Germany
Video games set in Lebanon
Video games developed in the United Kingdom